The Top 100 Crime Novels of All Time is a list published in book form in 1990 by the British-based Crime Writers' Association. Five years later, the Mystery Writers of America published a similar list titled The Top 100 Mystery Novels of All Time. Many titles can be found in both lists.

See also 
 Tozai Mystery Best 100

References

 
Top book lists
Lists of novels
1990 non-fiction books
Books about books
Crime Writers' Association awards
Awards established in 1990